Methylenedioxyallylamphetamine (MDAL or 3,4-methylenedioxy-N-allylamphetamine) is a lesser-known psychedelic drug. It is also the N-allyl derivative of 3,4-methylenedioxyamphetamine (MDA). MDAL was first synthesized by Alexander Shulgin. In his book PiHKAL, the minimum dosage is listed as 180 mg, and the duration unknown. MDAL produces few to no effects on its own, but may enhance the effects of LSD.  Very little data exists about the pharmacological properties, metabolism, and toxicity of MDAL.

Legality

United Kingdom
This substance is a Class A drug in the Drugs controlled by the UK Misuse of Drugs Act.

See also 
 Phenethylamine
 MDPR

References

Substituted amphetamines
Allyl compounds
Benzodioxoles